José García Gaspar (born 20 March 1946) is a Mexican long-distance runner. He competed in the marathon at the 1968 Summer Olympics.

References

External links
 

1946 births
Living people
Athletes (track and field) at the 1968 Summer Olympics
Mexican male long-distance runners
Mexican male marathon runners
Olympic athletes of Mexico
Athletes from Mexico City
Pan American Games medalists in athletics (track and field)
Pan American Games silver medalists for Mexico
Athletes (track and field) at the 1971 Pan American Games
Medalists at the 1971 Pan American Games
20th-century Mexican people